Rodolfo Joaquin Micheli (24 April 1930 – 27 December 2022) was an Argentine footballer who played as a striker. He was the topscorer of the 1955 South American Championship.

Club career
Micheli started his professional playing career with Argentino de Quilmes in 1950. He returned to Independiente in 1952, where he played 147 games for the club scoring 52 goals. In 1958 he joined River Plate but only played 2 games for the club before moving on to Club Atlético Huracán in 1959.

Micheli joined Colombian side Millonarios in 1960, but he soon returned to Argentina where he played for Club Atlético Platense.
In 1964 as player and Manager of Colegiales and in 1965 he joined Juventud Unida de San Miguel.

International career
Micheli played for Argentina 13 times between 1953 and 1956 scoring 10 goals. 8 of his goals came in the Copa América 1955, where he was the top-scorer, helping Argentina to win the championship.

Managerial career
Micheli had been working as the coach of the Club Atlético Los Andes ladies team.

Personal life and death
Micheli died on 28 December 2022, at the age of 92.

Honours
Argentina
 Copa América: 1955

References

External links
 Los Andes (Femenino) manager profile

1930 births
2022 deaths
Sportspeople from Buenos Aires Province
Argentine footballers
Association football forwards
Argentine Primera División players
Categoría Primera A players
Club Atlético Independiente footballers
Club Atlético River Plate footballers
Club Atlético Huracán footballers
Millonarios F.C. players
Club Atlético Platense footballers
Argentina international footballers
Expatriate footballers in Colombia
Copa América-winning players